Lucio Salvatore (born May 3, 1975) is an Italian-born multidisciplinary Brazilian artist who works with sculpture, photography, text, painting, performance and appropriation of processes. Salvatore lives and works in Rio de Janeiro and in Sant’Elia Fiumerapido, Italy. Salvatore’s artworks are situations created with heterogeneous elements, processes and people that work together in experimental form. His work is seen as a critique of both centralized and decentralized powers and its abuses, social control and consumerism in its broadest declination, especially cultural.

Salvatore is known for his body of work 'Some Other Race', a unique series of conceptual artworks created with human blood that opens new perspectives on the way the nature of the work of art can be thought. Through parodies of scientific methods of classifications and categorizations, Salvatore looks at the common elements that precede rigid definitions of people's identities, the indiscernible nature of the fluid from where any difference comes from, as the artist declares in his interview with Brazilian journalist Jo Soares in 2010.

Biography 

Salvatore was born in Cassino where he attended the Liceo Classico ‘G. Carducci’. He graduated in economics from Bocconi University in Milan (March 1998). During this time, he also attended philosophy courses at the University of Milan. He studied photography in New York City where he lived from 2002 to 2010 and fine arts at Escola de Artes Visuais Parque Lage in Rio de Janeiro, where Salvatore developed his roots as an artist.

Exhibitions 

 Museum of Modern Art, Rio de Janeiro, Brazil, Lucio Salvatore | Metaelementi (2017-2018)

 Martha Pagy Gallery, Rio de Janeiro, Brazil, Lucio Salvatore | Controvalori (2018)

 Palazzo Pamphilj, Galleria     Cortona and Galleria Candido Portinari, Roma, Italy, Lucio Salvatore | Parque Lage (2017)

 Centro Cultural Correios, Rio de Janeiro, Brazil, Lucio Salvatore | Arte Capital (2016)
 Centro Cultural Correios, Rio de Janeiro, Brazil, Lucio Salvatore | Fragmento (2015)
 Centro Cultural Correios, Rio de Janeiro, Brazil, Lucio Salvatore | Redução Espacial (2014)
 Museu Brasileiro da Escultura, São Paulo, Brazil, Lucio Salvatore | Blood (2011)
 Openhouse Gallery, New York, USA, Lucio Salvatore | Studio (2009)
 Superstudio, Milano, Italy, Lucio Salvatore | Untitled (2008)
 Jardim Botânico, Rio de Janeiro, Brazil, Lucio Salvatore | Untitled (2008)

References 

Artists from Rio de Janeiro (city)
People from Cassino
Italian photographers
Italian male sculptors
1975 births
21st-century Brazilian sculptors
Brazilian photographers
Bocconi University alumni
Living people
Italian emigrants to Brazil
Italian expatriates in the United States
University of Milan alumni
21st-century Italian sculptors
21st-century Italian male artists